Watkins is an English and Welsh surname derived as a patronymic from Watkin, in turn a diminutive of the name Watt (also Wat), a popular Middle English given name itself derived as a pet form of the name Walter.  

Notable people with the surname include:

 A. W. Watkins (1895–1970), English sound engineer
 Aaron Watkins (golfer) (born 1982), American golfer
 Aaron S. Watkins (1863–1941), American academic and politician
 Alan Watkins (1933–2010), Welsh journalist
 Alfred Watkins (1855–1935), English proponent of ley lines, pioneer photographer, author
 Alfred Ernest Watkins (1878–1957), Welsh footballer
 Ali Watkins (born 1992), American journalist
 Allan Watkins (1922–2011), Welsh cricketer
 Anna Watkins (born 1983), English rower
 Arthur Vivian Watkins (1886–1973), American politician
 Austin Watkins (born 1998), American football player
 Barry Watkins (1921–2004), Welsh footballer
 Ben Watkins, English musician
 Beverly Watkins (1939–2019), American blues guitarist
 Bill Watkins (disambiguation), several people
 Bob Watkins (born 1948), American baseball player
 Boyce Watkins (born 1971), American economist, academic and social commentator
 Bruce R. Watkins (1924–1980), American activist
 Calvert Watkins (1933–2013), American linguist
 Carlene Watkins (born 1952), American actress
 Carleton Watkins (1829–1916), American photographer
 Carlos Watkins (born 1993), American football player
 Charles Watkins (disambiguation), several people
 Charlie Watkins (footballer) (1921–1998), Scottish professional football player and manager
 Charlie Watkins (audio engineer) (1923–2014), British audio engineer
 Chloe Watkins (born 1992), Irish field hockey player
 Christine Watkins (born 1950), American politician
 Claire Vaye Watkins (born 1984), American author
 Craig Watkins (born 1967), American lawyer
 D. Watkins (born 1980), American author
 Daniel Watkins (1918–1982), New Zealand businessman
 Danny Watkins (born 1984), American football player
 Darren Watkins Jr. (born 2005), known professionally as IShowSpeed, American YouTuber and streamer
 Darryl Watkins (born 1984), American basketball player
 David Watkins (disambiguation), also Dave Watkins, several people
 Dean Watkins, American engineer and candidate for Vice-President
 Derek Watkins (disambiguation), also Derrick Watkins, several people
 Diante Watkins (born 1990), American basketball player
 Doc Watkins (born 1981), American musician
 Doug Watkins (1934–1962), American jazz bassist
 Dudley D. Watkins (1907–1969), English comics artist and Desperate Dan creator
 Edgar Watkins (born 1887), British gymnast
 Edward Watkins (disambiguation), several people
 Elwyn Watkins (born 1963), British politician
 Emily Watkins, British chef
 Emma Watkins (born 1989), Australian singer, actress, and dancer
 Enid Watkins (1890–1971), American singer and dancer
 Eric Watkins (1880–1949), New Zealand rugby footballer
 Ernest Watkins (1902–1982), Canadian politician
 Ernest Watkins (footballer, born 1878) (1878–1957), Welsh footballer
 Ernie Watkins (footballer, born 1898) (1898–1976), English footballer
 Evan Watkins (1882-1956), Welsh rugby footballer
 Elizabeth Watkins (1923-2012), English author
 Fenwick Watkins (1887–1943), American athlete and coach
 Frank Watkins (pilot) (1922–1942), Royal New Zealand Air Force officer
 Frederick Watkins (disambiguation), also Fred Watkins, several people
 George D. Watkins (born 1924), American physicist
 Geraint Watkins (born 1951), Welsh musician
 Gérard Watkins (born 1965), English actor
 Gino Watkins (1907–1932), British Arctic explorer
 Glenn Watkins (1927–2021), American musicologist
 Gloria Watkins (1952–2021), African-American writer known as bell hooks
 Gordon Watkins (1907–1974), American football player
 Gordon Samuel Watkins (1889–1970), American labor economist and university administrator
 Harry Watkins (disambiguation), several people
 Harvey Watkins (1869–1949), American baseball manager
 Harvey Watkins Jr. (born 1954), American musician
 Henry Watkins (disambiguation), several people
 Hugh Watkins (referee) (born 1963), Welsh rugby referee
 Hugh Christian Watkins (born 1959), English cardiologist
 Ian Watkins (disambiguation), several people
 Islwyn Watkins (1938–2018), Welsh artist
 J. Elfreth Watkins (1852–1903), American engineer
 Jackie Watkins (born 1949), Australian politician
 Jacoby Watkins (born 1984), American football coach
 Jameel Watkins (born 1977), American basketball player
 James Watkins (disambiguation), several people
 Jaylen Watkins (born 1991), American football player
 Jenny Watkins-Isnardi, Welsh singer
 Jason Watkins (disambiguation), several people
 Jessica Watkins (born 1988), American astronaut
 Jim Watkins (disambiguation), also Jimmy Watkins, several people
 John Watkins (disambiguation), several people
 Kallum Watkins (born 1991), British rugby league footballer
 Kathleen Watkins (born 1934), Irish broadcaster, actress, and musician, wife of Gay Byrne
 Kit Watkins (born 1953), American musician
 Kobie Watkins (born 1975), American percussionist
 Larry Watkins (born 1946), American football player
 Leonard Watkins (1859–1901), Welsh international rugby player
 Levi Watkins (1944–2015), American heart surgeon and civil rights activist
 Linda Watkins (1908–1976), American actress
 Logan Watkins (born 1989), American baseball player
 Lovelace Watkins (1933–1995), American singer
 Luke Watkins (born 1989), British boxer
 Lynn B. Watkins (1836–1901), American judge
 Margaret Watkins (1884–1969), Canadian photographer
 Marley Watkins (born 1990), Welsh footballer
 Mart Watkins (1880–1942), Welsh footballer
 Mary Watkins (born 1939), American musician and composer
 Mary Watkins, Baroness Watkins of Tavistock (born 1955), British peer
 Matt Watkins (born 1986), Canadian hockey player
 Matthew Watkins (1978–2020), Welsh rugby union player
 Maurice Watkins (boxer) (born 1956), American boxer
 Maurice Watkins (solicitor) (born 1941), British solicitor and football club administrator
 Maurine Dallas Watkins (1896?–1969), American dramatist
 Mel Watkins (1932–2020), Canadian economist
 Mel Watkins (American writer) (born 1940)
 Melvin Watkins (born 1954), American basketball coach
 Michael Watkins (disambiguation), several people
 Michaela Watkins (born 1971), American actress
 Mike Watkins (disambiguation), several people
 Nathan Watkins (born 1977), American soccer player
 Ollie Watkins (born 1995), English footballer
 Oscar Ferris Watkins (1877–1943), British colonial administrator
 Paul Watkins (disambiguation), several people
 Peter Watkins (born 1935), English film director
 Peter Watkins (civil servant) (born 1959), British civil servant
 Peter Watkins (politician) (born 1929), Australian politician
 Quez Watkins (born 1998), American football player
 Roderick Watkins (born 1964), English composer
 Roger Watkins (1948–2007), American film director
 Rokevious Watkins (born 1989), American football player
 Ronald Watkins (1904–2001), British drama teacher
 Ruth Watkins, American speech pathologist and academic administrator
 Ryan Watkins (born 1983), Welsh cricketer
 Samuel R. Watkins (1839–1901), American author and humorist
 Sammy Watkins (disambiguation), several people
 Sara Watkins (born 1981), American musician
 Sean Watkins (born 1977), American guitarist
 Sherron Watkins (born 1959), American executive, Enron vice president
 Sid Watkins (1928–2012), English surgeon and race doctor
 Skeeter Watkins (1915–1987), American baseball player
 Spenser Watkins (born 1992), American baseball player
 Steven Watkins (disambiguation), also Steve, and Stephen Watkins, several people
 Stuart Watkins (born 1941), Welsh international rugby player
 Sylvania Watkins (born 1985), American basketball player
 Tasker Watkins (1918–2007), Welsh judge and Victoria Cross recipient
 Thomas Watkins (disambiguation), several people
 Tionne Watkins (born 1970), American singer
 Tobias Watkins (1780–1855), American physician, essayist and government official
 Tom Watkins (disambiguation), also Tommy Watkins, several people
 Torrance Watkins (born 1949), American equestrian
 Travis E. Watkins (1920–1950), American Medal of Honor recipient
 Tuc Watkins (born 1966), American actor
 Vernon Watkins (1906–1967), Welsh poet
 Walter H. Watkins (1878–1937), American football coach
 Wes Watkins (born 1938), American politician
 William Watkins (disambiguation), several people
 Winifred Watkins (1924–2003), British biochemist

See also 
 Atkins (surname)
 Walter (name)
 Watkin
 Watkinson
 Watling
 Watson (surname) 
 Watt (surname)
 Watts (surname)
 Latham & Watkins, American legal firm

English-language surnames
Surnames of Welsh origin
Patronymic surnames
Surnames from given names